The Truth of Trumpets is Alove for Enemies first EP, released in 2001 on Polytope Records. This EP is extremely hard to find and is Alove For Enemies most Metal effort rather than their Hardcore/Metalcore sound. The title track of the EP was re-written and re-recorded for their Facedown Records debut, 2005's The Harvest

Track listing
Repetition of a Dying Day
The Table Set With Sin
Shadow of Yesterday
Perfect Blue
The Truth of Trumpets

2001 debut EPs
Alove for Enemies albums